Fola Evans-Akingbola() (born 26 September 1994) is a British actress. She played Maddie Bishop in the Freeform series Siren.

Early life 
Evans-Akingbola was born in London, to an English anthropologist mother, Dr Gillian Evans, and Nigerian musician father Sola Akingbola (of the band Jamiroquai). She was raised in Bermondsey with her sister while educated in Dulwich. She received acting training at the National Youth Theatre and Identity School of Acting.

Career 
Before acting professionally, Evans-Akingbola worked as a model.

Her first acting credits were for the BBC series Youngers and Holby City. While appearing on a third BBC series, Death in Paradise, Evans-Akingbola was cast in the popular HBO series Game of Thrones as the (unnamed) second wife of Khal Moro during series 6. For Netflix's Black Mirror (a continuation of the Channel 4 series that debuted in 2011), she appeared in a 2019 episode called "Striking Vipers" as Mariella, a younger Millennial woman dating Karl (Yahya Abdul-Mateen II), who is the co-protagonist of the episode. Since 2018, she has been a main character on Siren, playing marine biologist Madelyn Bishop. She has also directed, co-wrote, and produced a short film called Grandma's 80th Surprise and done voiceover work for Assassin's Creed video games.

Filmography

References

Notes

External links 

Living people
1994 births
British people of Nigerian descent
National Youth Theatre members
People from Bermondsey
People from Southwark
Black British actresses
English female models
English people of Nigerian descent
English people of Yoruba descent
Yoruba actresses
Actresses from London